Winner Take All is an American radio-television game show that ran from 1946 to 1952 on CBS and NBC. It was the first game show produced by the Mark Goodson-Bill Todman partnership. The series was originally hosted by Ward Wilson, but is best known for being the first game hosted by Bill Cullen.

Although the game format was very simple, Winner Take All served as the genesis for many future game-show formats. It was the first game to use lockout devices, and the first to use returning champions.

Gameplay
Two contestants – one with a buzzer, the other with a bell – competed in answering general-knowledge questions, questions based on skits performed beforehand, or doing discovery tests (usually while blindfolded) inside the studio.

The first contestant to sound their signal and give the right answer to the question would score one point, with a wrong answer allowing the opponent a free chance to answer the next question unopposed. The first player to score three points won the game and a prize, then stayed on to face another challenger.

Broadcast history
Winner Take All debuted and aired weekdays on CBS Radio on June 3, 1946. Original emcee Ward Wilson stepped down after just three months at the helm, and announcer Bill Cullen stepped in as a temporary host on September 9. Cullen's work on the show stunned executives, who made his hosting job permanent.

CBS primetime
CBS, noting the show's popularity on daytime radio, moved the series to primetime television on July 1, 1948, with Bud Collyer as host. The radio series continued with Cullen for another two years, with Collyer taking over in August 1950. The televised Winner, bowed on October 3, 1950.

CBS daytime
The network refused to give up on a popular format, however, and attempted a second television run for its daytime schedule. Debuting on February 12, 1951, at 2:45 PM with radio personality Barry Gray as emcee, this iteration aired for 45 minutes on Mondays, Wednesdays, and Fridays; on Tuesdays and Thursdays, the show aired for a half-hour and was paired with Bride and Groom.

The series originally ran up against the informational show Vacation Wonderland on NBC and local programming on ABC (which did not program from 2:00-3:00 until 1958). On March 12, Wonderland was cut back to 15 minutes and moved to 3:15 PM; its replacement, the soap opera Miss Susan, did not do very well but nonetheless managed to beat Winner by enough in the ratings.

The 2:45 slot was not too popular; the two shows to occupy that position prior to Winner, a variety show hosted by Robert Q. Lewis and the 45-minute Johnny Johnston Show, did not last very long – Lewis' show ended after seven weeks, and Johnston's bombed in three weeks. Winner bowed from the television airwaves once again on April 20, 1951, followed by its radio counterpart on February 1, 1952.

NBC daytime
Meanwhile, NBC, looking for a show to replace its faltering game It's In The Bag at 10:30 AM, struck a deal with Goodson-Todman to air a new daytime version with Cullen returning as emcee.

Debuting on February 25, 1952, the series originally went against either local programming or Arthur Godfrey Time on CBS and, as before, local programming on ABC (which did not program at 10:30 until 1964). On the days that Godfrey aired at 10:30, Winner did not fare well. On April 7, CBS permanently slotted a program at 10:30 to provide a constant network opponent to Winner – Bride and Groom. Winner ended on April 25 after just nine weeks.

Matinee in New York
Winner returned to NBC's daytime schedule on June 9, 1952, in an unorthodox form – as a segment of the hour-long weekday variety show Matinee in New York, which aired at 4:00 PM. Matinee ended on September 5, 1952.

Play For Keeps!
On November 18, 1955, in the midst of the big-money quiz-show craze, CBS tried a revival for their daytime schedule with Sonny Fox as host. This pilot is usually cited in "what if?" discussions regarding a big-money Goodson-Todman quiz show, as in this pilot the "returning champion" had "previously won" $15,000 and there was no earnings cap.

The rules were a bit different, in that the champion chose from one of ten categories, then wagered all or part of their previous winnings. If the champion defended their title, the money bet was added to their pre-bet total by the show; if the challenger won, s/he got the wagered money and the former champion had the wager deducted from their winnings.

Episode status
Both the radio and television versions are believed to have been destroyed as per network practices. Of the radio series, only three episodes hosted by Cullen are known to exist.

Only two episodes of Gray's version exist, from April 1951. Cullen's version fared better, with four episodes surviving (February 27–28, March 5, and a fourth episode with a more elaborate set). These six episodes have been seen on GSN at one time or another. On September 7, 2015 and September 13, 2017, Buzzr aired the pilot as part of their "Lost and Found" event. They eventually aired a 1951 episode, on January 16, 2023.

Play For Keeps! is held by the UCLA Film & Television Archive.

No Wilson, Collyer, or Matinee-era episodes are known to exist. However, the May 1949 CBS sales film "Television Today" (made for potential TV advertisers) shows "Winner Take All" with Bud Collyer and contestants being produced in the CBS studios, provided as example of the kind of fare available on TV at the time.

Overseas

Australia 
The Major Broadcasting Network produced a local radio version of the program in the late 1940s and early 50s. It was transferred to the rival Macquarie Radio Network in 1951. The Australian version of the program was compered by Bob Dyer, assisted by his wife Dolly Dyer, an Australian showgirl.  Bob Dyer was born in Hartsville, Tennessee, but became a permanent Australian resident in 1940, even though he retained his US citizenship until his death in 1984. Bob and Dolly Dyer compered a number of Australian radio and TV shows, mainly quizzes. They are very well remembered for their radio/TV program Pick a Box.

References

CBS original programming
NBC original programming
American radio game shows
1948 American television series debuts
1952 American television series endings
1940s American game shows
1950s American game shows
1940s Australian game shows
1950s Australian game shows
Television series by Mark Goodson-Bill Todman Productions
Black-and-white American television shows
English-language television shows